William Auld Tait (1826 – February 3, 1900) was a Canadian pioneer and politician. He served as a member of the Temporary North-West Council from March 26, 1874 to November 7, 1876.

References

External links
William Auld Tait biography

1826 births
1900 deaths
Members of the Legislative Assembly of the Northwest Territories
Members of the Legislative Assembly of Assiniboia